The 2009 ATS F3 Cup was the seventh edition of the German F3 Cup. It commenced on 12 April and ended on 18 October. Belgian driver Laurens Vanthoor (Van Amersfoort Racing) won the title with two rounds to spare.

Teams and drivers
Guest drivers in italics.
{|
|

Calendar
Five rounds were part of the ADAC Master Weekend with rounds supporting 24 Hours Nürburgring in May, FIA GT Oschersleben 2 Hours in June, Rizla Race Day and 1000 km Nürburgring in August. With the exception of round at TT Circuit Assen, all rounds took place on German soil.

Standings

ATS Formel 3 Cup
Points are awarded as follows:

† — Drivers did not finish the race, but were classified as they completed over 90% of the race distance.

ATS Formel 3 Trophy
Points are awarded for both races as follows:

† — Drivers did not finish the race, but were classified as they completed over 90% of the race distance.

ATS Formel 3 Junior-Pokal (Rookie)
Points are awarded for both races as follows:

ATS Formel 3 Speed-Pokal
Points are awarded for both races as follows:

References

External links
 

German Formula Three Championship seasons
Formula Three
German
German Formula 3 Championship